Pierre-François Aubameyang (also spelled Aubame-Eyang; born 29 May 1965) is a Gabonese former professional footballer who played as a midfielder. He spent most of his career at French clubs Stade Lavallois and Le Havre. At international level, he won 29 caps for the Gabon national team. He also holds a French passport. He is the father of Catilina, Willy and Pierre-Emerick.

During his time at Stade Lavallois, Aubameyang became so sick he could not walk. His then-teammate, Franck Leboeuf, claims that the malady was healed by a marabout with black magic after medical doctors could not cure him.

Post-playing career
Aubameyang worked as a scout for A.C. Milan.

In September 2018, he was reported to have become joint managers of the Gabon national team with Daniel Cousin. However, a few days later, his son, Pierre-Emerick, said he had not accepted the position. The Gabonese FA admitted they had made an error, and that Cousin was the sole manager.

References

External links 
 Profile at akebefoot.free.fr 
 
 

1965 births
Living people
FC Rouen players
Association football defenders
Gabonese footballers
Gabon international footballers
Le Havre AC players
OGC Nice players
Stade Lavallois players
Toulouse FC players
Ligue 1 players
Ligue 2 players
U.S. Triestina Calcio 1918 players
Atlético Junior footballers
Categoría Primera A players
FC 105 Libreville players
1994 African Cup of Nations players
Gabonese expatriate sportspeople in France
Gabonese expatriate sportspeople in Italy
1996 African Cup of Nations players
Gabonese expatriate footballers
Expatriate footballers in Italy
Expatriate footballers in Colombia
Gabonese expatriate sportspeople in Colombia
People from Woleu-Ntem Province
Gabon national football team managers
Gabonese football managers
USM Malakoff (football) players
Association football scouts
A.C. Milan non-playing staff